Stratford Shoal Light, officially  Stratford Shoal (Middle Ground) Light, is a lighthouse on a shoal in the middle of Long Island Sound approximately halfway between Port Jefferson, New York and Bridgeport, Connecticut.

Location
There was some debate about whether the lighthouse is New York or Connecticut.

The lighthouse is located on Stratford (or Middleground) Shoal which is a little over a mile in diameter and as little as nine feet below mean lower low water. The shoal has been identified as a danger to navigation for centuries.

History
Adriaen Block, the first European to explore Long Island Sound, identified two low islands at the site of current Stratford Shoal during his 1614 voyage.  These islands were eroded below the surface of the water within 100 or 200 years.  The shoal was first marked for navigation in 1820 by a pair of spar buoys placed on its north and south ends.  In 1831, Congress appropriated $1,000 to erect a warning beacon on the shoal, but no further action was taken on the project.  The beacon was to have had the shape of an iron spindle.

Lightship LV-15
Congress next appropriated $10,000 for the construction of a "floating light for Middle Ground, Long Island Sound". It carried a lantern on each of its two masts, plus a hand-operated bell and a foghorn as fog signals. The lightship was anchored off the southeastern edge of Stratford Shoal on January 12, 1838; just eight days later, it drifted off its station. The lightship would display a chronic inability to hold its station in future years, even after its single anchor chain was supplemented with second and third anchors. It was dragged from its station by ice more than half a dozen times, most notably in 1875 when it ran aground at Orient Point, and in 1876 when it drifted to Faulkner Island.

When standard hull numbers were assigned to lightships in 1867, the Stratford Shoals lightship was named LV-15; previously it had been known as "Middle Ground floating light", "Stratford Shoal Light Vessel," or "Stratford Point Light Vessel".

Lighthouse
The Stratford Shoal lighthouse was completed in 1877 to replace the lightship. The lighthouse was constructed on a small, man-made island (on the spot of two former natural islands that were washed over by the sea). Originally, lighthouse keepers were utilized to maintain the facility. The lighthouse was automated in 1970 and is currently an active aid to navigation.

It has historical significance as an example of the masonry lighthouse design used in waterbound U.S. lighthouses immediately before the use of sparkplug lighthouses.  It is similar to some Hudson River lighthouses, and "embodies the enormous cost and heroic effort required to put these designs in place in the treacherous waters of Long Island Sound."

Yacht Racing
Several local yacht clubs located on Long Island Sound use the lighthouse as a midpoint or rounding marker for races all called the Stratford Shoals Race.  One annual regatta dating back to 1931 organized by Riverside Yacht Club continues to this day; while others are more recent including 2018 races by Lloyd Harbor YC, Seawanhaka Corinthian Yacht Club, and the New York Athletic Club.

Head keepers

 William McGloin 1877 – 1880
 James G. Scott 1880 – 1885
 Ezra S. Mott 1885 – 1888
 Elisha E. Davis 1888 – 1893
 Richard E. Ray 1894 – 1900
 Herman Burke 1900 – 1901
 Gilbert L. Rulon 1901 – 1910
 Alfred Nelsen 1910 – 1913
 Emil M. Usinger 1915
 Victor Larson 1917
 Colby H. Crandall 1919
 Henry R. McCarthy 1921 – 1922
 Lewis J. Allen 1930 – 1940
 Harry C. Buede 1955 – 1962

See also

 List of lighthouses in Connecticut
 List of lighthouses in the United States
 National Register of Historic Places listings in Fairfield County, Connecticut

References

External links

  
 - the light house is in the beginning of this video

Lighthouses completed in 1877
1877 establishments in Connecticut
Lighthouses in Fairfield County, Connecticut
Buildings and structures in Stratford, Connecticut
Lighthouses on the National Register of Historic Places in Connecticut
Historic American Engineering Record in Connecticut
National Register of Historic Places in Fairfield County, Connecticut